Dazzle Vision was a Japanese rock band. They appeared at Sakura-Con in 2010. After playing in Taiwan in 2006, Dazzle Vision released their first album Origin of Dazzle. They were well known for their heavy rock sound and female vocalist Maiko's alternating melodic/death-voice vocals. 
The band announced their disbandment in April 2015.

History

Formation
Dazzle Vision formed in 2003. The two main founders of Dazzle Vision are brother and sister, Maiko and Takuro. Up until 2010, Dazzle Vision did not maintain a steady line-up, changing the drummer and several guitarists. Because of the line up changes, Dazzle Vision has managed to continue on with their work. Past members of the band are Natu (Dr.) (2003–2004), Tan (Gui.) (2003–2006), Ryu (Gui.) (2006–2008), and Yu (Gui.) (2008–2010). As of 2010 the main band members consisted of Maiko (vocals), Takuro (bass), John (guitar), and Haru (drums).

Influences, concepts, and musical styles

Maiko and Takuro began the band as an outlet for creation which is a part of the band's concept. The entire concept of the band was "Children Create The World" and was also a part of their logo. Drawing on outside sources Dazzle Vision grew its style. While basic influences from Western culture have impacted the band, several famous bands such as Evanescence, Black Sabbath, and Metallica have shaped the sound and style of Dazzle Vision.
While the band self-described themselves as Screamo-Pop, they branched out into many different music genres such as alternative metal, hard rock, melodic death metal, progressive rock, glam metal, pop, post-hardcore, screamo and forerunners of kawaii metal. The band's albums each have a new distinct sound different from the last. Among the Japanese alternative scene, Dazzle Vision made an impact, mixing their strong vocals, dark riffs, and powerhouse screamo rants.

Discography

Albums
Dazzle Vision produced seven albums. Each album has a different sound from the last, with the most predominate sound being alternative metal.

 Origin of Dazzle (November 3, 2005)
 Origin Of Dazzle 2nd edition (March 28, 2008)
 Camellia Japonica (April 23, 2007)
 Crystal Children (November 21, 2008)
 To The Next (May 12, 2010) (US debut)
 Kirari (June 3, 2011)
 Shocking Loud Voice (May 4, 2012)
 Final Attack (March 7, 2014)

Singles
 Metsu / All refused (November 21, 2008)
 Evolution (November 9, 2012)

References

External links
 

Japanese alternative metal musical groups
Screamo musical groups
Kawaii metal musical groups
Japanese alternative rock groups
Female-fronted musical groups